The 1974 Intercontinental Cup was an association football tie held over two legs in March and April 1975 between Independiente, winners of the 1974 Copa Libertadores, and the runners up of the 1973–74 European Cup, Atlético Madrid, as the winners Bayern Munich declined to participate.

The first leg was held on 12 March 1975 at the Estadio Libertadores de América, then known as the Estadio de Independiente or La Doble Visera, home of Independiente. The match finished up as a 1–0 victory for the local team, with a goal scored by Agustín Balbuena in the 34th minute.

Vicente Calderón Stadium hosted the return leg on 10 April 1975. Atlético Madrid won the second leg 2–0. The goals came from Javier Irureta in the 23rd and Rubén Ayala in the 85th minute. Atlético Madrid won 2–1 on aggregate, and became the only team to win the Intercontinental Cup without winning a continental championship.

Match details

First leg

Second leg

See also
1973–74 European Cup
1974 Copa Libertadores
Atlético Madrid in European football

References

Intercontinental Cup
Intercontinental Cup
Inter
Intercontinental Cup
Intercontinental Cup (football)
Intercontinental Cup 1974
Intercontinental Cup 1974
International club association football competitions hosted by Spain
International club association football competitions hosted by Argentina
March 1975 sports events in Europe
April 1975 sports events in Europe
March 1975 sports events in South America
April 1975 sports events in South America
Sports competitions in Madrid
1970s in Madrid
Football in Avellaneda